From April 2–3, 1982, a major tornado outbreak resulted in over 60 tornadoes and 30 fatalities, primarily over portions of Northeast Texas and Southwest Arkansas, as well as Southeastern Oklahoma. Three of the tornadoes were rated F4, and one officially was recorded as an F5 near Broken Bow, Oklahoma, all on April 2. Beginning on April 2, a series of tornado-producing supercells formed across portions of northeastern Texas and southeastern Oklahoma. The F5 tornado resulted in no fatalities, but an F4 tornado in Paris, Texas, resulted in 10 fatalities and 170 injuries. Additionally, the Storm Prediction Center, known then as the Severe Local Storms Unit, issued its first officially documented high risk on April 2 as well as the first tornado watch to contain the wording Particularly Dangerous Situation (PDS).

Background

Outbreak statistics

Confirmed tornadoes

April 2 event

Speer–Messer–Golden–Broken Bow, Oklahoma

This powerful, multiple-vortex tornado touched down near Speer, tracked east-southeastward through the rural community of Messer, and traversed the Hugo Reservoir. A newly constructed home near Messer was obliterated, with only strips of carpet tacking left unmoved. At the time the tornado was assigned a rating of F5 based on this damage and is still listed as an F5 in official records. Photographs of the bare concrete slab suggested, however, that the home was improperly anchored: only F3-level winds may have been needed to produce the observable effects on the structure. In all, the tornado destroyed approximately 35 homes and yielded losses of $8 million, though it missed densely populated areas. The tornado also destroyed chicken coops, mobile homes, and a church, along with agricultural implements, electrical lines, and tracts of timber. Up to 40 barns were wrecked as well. As it passed just south of Broken Bow, the tornado struck the Tri-A-Nite Motel; signage from the motel was later found  distant, in Arkansas. Near Messer, the tornado hurled a  board into and pierced a tree. 29 injuries occurred along the path.

Paris–Reno–Blossom, Texas

This destructive tornado, the deadliest of the outbreak, headed eastward through the northern section of Paris. It extensively damaged or destroyed more than 465 residences and left approximately 1,000 people homeless in town. Of the 10 deaths in Paris, two occurred at a trailer park; the rest of the fatalities were mainly in unsheltered locations. Debris from the trailer park was dispersed for hundreds of yards. Most of the damage in Paris was rated F2 or F3 on the Fujita scale, but a few CBS homes sustained low-end F4-level damage. These homes, however, were dubiously constructed, so the official rating may have been too high. Large, well-built apartments with numerous interior walls were unroofed as the "ragged funnel cloud" left behind $50 million in losses at Paris. 92 homes and other structures were heavily damaged or destroyed in the neighbouring communities of Reno and Blossom.

White Rock–Beaver Dam, Texas/Ashdown, Arkansas

This intense, long-tracked tornado first destroyed barns, outbuildings, trees, and electrical lines as it struck White Rock. Brick-built homes in the area were wrecked as well. The tornado tracked to the north of Annona, Avery, and English. The tornado then entered Bowie County and destroyed five homes in Beaver Dam. Two minor injuries occurred nearby. Upon crossing the river into Oklahoma, it produced a  swath of damaged trees through McCurtain County. Some outbuildings were also damaged as the tornado passed through southeastern Oklahoma. In Arkansas, the tornado destroyed 17 homes, a paper mill, a granary, and an orchard. One of the homes dated to the early nineteenth century. One person died and two others were injured near Ashdown before the tornado dissipated.

See also
List of tornado outbreaks
List of North American tornadoes and tornado outbreaks
List of Storm Prediction Center high risk days

Notes

References

Sources
 
 
 
 
 
 

F4 tornadoes by date
F5 tornadoes by date
Tornadoes of 1982
Tornadoes in Oklahoma
Tornadoes in Texas
1982 in Texas
1982 in Oklahoma
1982 natural disasters in the United States
Tornado outbreak